Olearia ciliata, commonly known as the fringed daisy bush,  is a small shrub with large clusters of bright purple-blue flowers on a single stem.

Description
The stems are rough with short hairs and are finely ribbed usually branched from the base of the plant. The leaf margins are entire, rough with short white hairs, rolled under and fringed. The 3 green over-lapping bracts are woolly, narrow lance-shaped and fringed. The flower centre is yellow and consists of 40-75 disk florets. Flowers from late winter to spring on occasion in autumn.

Taxonomy and naming
Fringed daisy bush was first formally described in 1837 by George Bentham who gave it the name Eurybia ciliata in Stefan Endlicher's Enumeratio plantarum quas in Novae Hollandiae ora austro-occidentali ad fluvium Cygnorum et in sinu Regis Georgii collegit Carolus Liber Baro de Hügel from specimens collected near King George Sound. In 1867, George Bentham changed the name to Olearia ciliata in Flora Australiensis. The specific epithet (ciliata) means "fringed with fine hairs" and is derived from the Latin word cilium meaning "eyelash" or "eyelid".

Distribution and habitat
The fringed daisy-bush is a widespread species found in several southern Australian states predominantly on well-drained sandy soils.  In Victoria it grows on sandy and mallee heath in the north-west of Victoria and scattered locations in the woodlands of the Grampians, Brisbane Ranges and Wilsons Promontory. In Western Australia it grows on rocky lateritic or sandy soils on coastal dunes and sand plains mainly near Esperance and Albany. In South Australia mostly on coastal fringes and in Tasmania along the east and south-east coast.

References

ciliata
Flora of Victoria (Australia)
Flora of Western Australia
Flora of South Australia
Flora of Tasmania
Taxa named by Ferdinand von Mueller
Plants described in 1837